East Memphis is a region of Memphis, Tennessee with several defined and informal subdivisions and neighborhoods such as Colonial Acres, White Station-Yates, Sherwood Forest, Normal Station, High Point Terrace, Belle Meade, Normandy Meadows, St. Nick, Pleasant Acres, Balmoral, and Ridgeway. The general boundaries are informal:

On the West: Highland Street.
On the South: I-240
On the East: Traditionally, the eastern border was anything inside the I-240 loop, however, many extend this to the Germantown city limits and the Cordova community
On the North: Sam Cooper Blvd.

The primary zip codes in this area are 38111, 38117, and 38157, including 38120 and 38119. In 1950, the eastern boundary of Memphis was essentially the western boundary of what is today East Memphis. By the mid-1960s, most of East Memphis inside the I-240 loop had been annexed by the city of Memphis.

Region overview 

East Memphis is a commercial and residential powerhouse. Poplar Avenue provides the central east-west thoroughfare of the area, and there are many thriving businesses on and around it. East Memphis is the location of some of the largest Memphis homes, specifically those in the Walnut Grove area. It is also home to the looming Clark Tower, as there are no legal restrictions on the height of buildings outside of the downtown area. The area also has developed into a home for many businesses and law firms. Walnut Grove Rd. has a high concentration of churches and schools. Poplar Plaza Shopping center at the corner of Poplar and Highland St. could be the beginning of the East Memphis commercial district. Highland St. is mostly commercial, with a collection of high-rise low-to-moderate residential buildings, as well as Crichton College. The University of Memphis sits south of Central Ave. and north of Southern Ave, with the Highland strip bordering it on its western side. Further east on Poplar Ave., Laurelwood Shopping Center and Oak Court Mall, can be found. East Memphis covers areas outside of the I-240 Loop including the residential areas around Quince Road and Kirby Parkway, and River Oaks subdivision. A commercial center has developed around the intersection of Poplar and Ridgeway Road which includes the Hilton Memphis, the largest hotel in the city. The eastern border of the neighborhood is the Germantown city limits at Kirby Parkway.

The major shopping venues in East Memphis are Eastgate Shopping Center, Poplar Plaza Shopping Center, Oak Court Mall, Laurelwood Collection, Regalia, and Park Place Center.

Parks & places

Museums, parks, gardens 

Audubon Park
Dixon Gallery
Davis Park
Sea Isle Park
Willow Rd. Park
Pauline "Pep" Marquette Park
Memphis Country Club
Eastgate Shopping Center
Malco Paradiso Cinema Grill And IMAX
Oak Court Mall

Other places of note 

St. Francis Hospital
Baptist Memorial Hospital
Memorial Park Cemetery & Gardens
Theatre Memphis

Religion 

East Memphis is home to many churches of various denominations. The largest churches are Christ United Methodist Church with 6,000 members , St. Louis Catholic Church with about 5,000 members , Second Presbyterian Church with more than 4,800 members , and Highpoint Church with more than 3,500 members. Other places of worship include Robinhood Lane Baptist Church, Cherry Road Baptist Church and New Philadelphia Church. 

The area is also home to many of the city's Jewish congregations, including Baron Hirsch Synagogue, Anshei Sphard Beth El Emeth Congregation, Young Israel of Memphis, Beth Sholom, and Temple Israel.

Secondary schools

Public schools
East High School
Willow Oaks Elementary
Sea Isle Elementary
Colonial Middle
Overton High
Ridgeway Elementary, Middle and High
South Park Elementary
Sharpe Elementary
Sherwood Elementary and Middle
Richland Elementary School
White Station High School 
White Station Elementary School
White Station Middle School
Hickory Ridge Elementary and Middle

Religiously affiliated schools
 Catholic: Christian Brothers High School (All-boys, 9–12), St. Agnes Academy (All-girls, Pre-K-12), Holy Rosary School (Co-ed, Pre K–8), St. Ann School (Co-ed, K–8), St. Dominic School (All boys, Pre K–8), St. Louis School (Co-ed, Pre K–8), St. Michael School (Co-ed, Pre K–8)
 Church of Christ: Harding Academy (Co-ed, Pre K–12)
 Episcopal: St. Mary's Episcopal School (All-girls, Pre K–12)
 Lutheran: Christ The King Lutheran School (Co-ed, K–8)
 Jewish: Bornblum Solomon Schechter School (Co-ed, 1–8), Margolin Hebrew Academy (Co-ed, Pre K–12), Memphis Jewish High School (Co-ed, 9–12)
 Methodist: Christ Methodist Day School (Co-ed, Pre K–6)
 Nondenominational Christian: Briarcrest Christian School (Co-ed, Pre K–8), Evangelical Christian School (Co-ed Pre K–5), Hutchison School (All-girls, Pre K–12), Memphis University School (All-boys, 7–12)
 Presbyterian: Presbyterian Day School (All-boys, Pre K–6), Woodland Presbyterian School (Co-ed, Pre K–8)

Restaurants 

East Memphis is host to a plethora of dining establishments ranging from inexpensive barbecue/sandwich shops to four-star restaurants. These include One & Only BBQ, Three Little Pigs BBQ, Corky's, Pete & Sam's, Houston's, Buckley's Restaurant, Huey's and Folk's Folly.

Gallery

References

Jews and Judaism in Memphis, Tennessee
Neighborhoods in Memphis, Tennessee